Rade Opačić (born June 17, 1997) is a Serbian kickboxer fighting out of Hamilton, Canada. He currently competes in the Heavyweight division of ONE Championship.

As of October 2022, he is ranked as the tenth best heavyweight by Beyond Kick. Between February and July 2022, he was ranked as the tenth best heavyweight kickboxer in the world by Combat Press.

Biography and career
Opačić is the son of Serbian refugees from Croatia. He was born and grew up in Zemun district, Belgrade. He started Taekwondo at 10 years old and transitioned to Kickboxing at 14 as he was living in Canada. Due to his size he was already facing adults at 15 years old in exhibition fights.
Back in Serbia he joined the KBKS Gym and competed as an amateur until the age of 18. He won several titles including the 2015 WAKO European Junior Championship.

On October 27, 2016, Opačić took part in his first major professional event when he engaged in the K-1 World GP 2016 –95 kg Championship Tournament in Belgrade. He won his quarterfinal by decision against Emmanuel Payet from France before losing by unanimous decision in the semifinals against Fabio Kwasi.

On March 24, 2018, Opačić faced Tomáš Hron at the Night of Warriors 2018 event. He was defeated by decision.

On February 24, 2019, Opačić took part in an 8-man one night tournament at the Kunlun Fight 80 event. He won his quarter finals against Liu Wei by body shot knockout in the first round before losing by second-round TKO to top ranked heavyweight Roman Kryklia in the semifinals where he was knocked down five times.

Opačić was scheduled in a 4-man Heavyweight Tournament at the Enfusion 86 Road to Abu Dhabi event on June 28, 2019. Opačić won both his semi final against Daniel Galabarov and the final against Nidal Bchiri by first-round knockouts.
The tournament win qualified him for the year end Enfusion tournament in Abu Dhabi. On December 6, he was outpointed by Slovakia's Martin Pacas in his semifinal bout.

ONE Championship
Opačić was unable to fight in the first half of 2020 due to the COVID-19 pandemic. During this time it was announced he signed with the ONE Championship organization. On December 4, 2020, he faced veteran Errol Zimmerman for his promotional debut at ONE Championship: Big Bang 2 in Singapore. Opačić won the fight by spinning heel kick knockout in the second round.

Opačić was scheduled to face Bruno Susano at ONE Championship: Unbreakable on January 22, 2021. He won by second-round technical knockout.

Opačić was scheduled to face Patrick Schmid at ONE Championship: First Strike on October 15, 2021. Opačić defeated Schmid by second-round technical knockout. 

On January 28, 2022, Opačić faced Françesco Xhaja at ONE: Only the Brave. He won by second-round knockout, earning him a Performance of the Night bonus and tied the record for most knockouts in ONE Super Series.

Opačić was booked to face the one-time WGP Kickboxing Super Heavyweight champion Guto Inocente at ONE 157 on May 20, 2022. The bout was later postponed, as Inocente tested positive for COVID-19, and was rescheduled for ONE 158 on June 3, 2022. He lost the bout via KO stoppage due to a liver punch in the first round.

Opačić faced Giannis Stoforidis in the ONE Heavyweight Kickboxing World Grand Prix alternate bout at ONE on Prime Video 2 on September 30, 2022. He won the fight by a second-round knockout.

Titles and accomplishments

Professional
ONE Championship
 Performance of the Night (One time) 
 Most knockouts in ONE Super Series (5) 
Enfusion
 2019 Enfusion 4-man Heavyweight Qualifying Tournament Winner

Amateur
World Association of Kickboxing Organizations
 2015 WAKO European Junior Championships K-1 +91 kg 
 2015 WAKO World Cup in Hungary K-1 +91 kg Winner 
K-1
 2015 K-1 Open World Amateur Championships in Italy Heavyweight Winner

Fight record
 
|-  style="background:#cfc;"
| 2022-10-01 || Win||align=left| Giannis Stoforidis || ONE on Prime Video 2 || Kallang, Singapore || KO (Punches) || 2 || 1:52 

|- style="background:#fbb;"
| 2022-05-20 || Loss || align="left" | Guto Inocente || ONE 158 || Kallang, Singapore || KO (Body punch)|| 1||2:33 
|- style="background:#cfc;"
| 2022-01-28 || Win || align="left" | Françesco Xhaja || ONE: Only the Brave  || Kallang, Singapore || TKO (3 knockdown rule)|| 2|| 2:00

|- style="background:#cfc;"
| 2021-10-15 || Win || align="left" | Patrick Schmid || ONE Championship: First Strike  || Kallang, Singapore || TKO (knees) || 2 || 1:19

|-  style="background:#cfc;"
| 2021-01-22|| Win ||align=left| Bruno Susano || ONE Championship: Unbreakable || Kallang, Singapore || TKO (punches) || 2 || 1:11

|-  style="background:#cfc;"
| 2020-12-04 || Win ||align=left| Errol Zimmerman ||  ONE Championship: Big Bang 2 || Kallang, Singapore || KO (spinning heel kick) || 2|| 1:35

|- style="background:#fbb;"
| 2019-12-06 || Loss ||align=left| Martin Pacas || Enfusion 92, Heavyweight Tournament, Semifinals || Abu Dhabi, United Arab Emirates || Decision (unanimous) || 3 || 3:00

|-  style="background:#cfc;"
| 2019-06-28|| Win ||align=left| Nidal Bchiri || Enfusion 86 Road to Abu Dhabi, Final || Belgrade, Serbia || KO (punches) || 1|| 1:38
|-
! style=background:white colspan=9 |
|-  style="background:#cfc;"
| 2019-06-28|| Win ||align=left| Daniel Galabarov || Enfusion 86 Road to Abu Dhabi, Semifinals || Belgrade, Serbia || KO (punches) || 1||

|-  style="background:#fbb;"
| 2019-04-27 || Loss ||align=left| Martin Pacas || Enfusion 83 || Zilina, Slovakia || Decision (unanimous) || 3 || 3:00

|-  style="background:#fbb;"
| 2019-02-24||Loss ||align=left| Roman Kryklia || Kunlun Fight 80 - Heavyweight Tournament, Semifinals || Shanghai, China || TKO (referee stoppage/5 knockdowns) || 2 ||

|-  style="background:#cfc;"
| 2019-02-24|| Win ||align=left| Liu Wei || Kunlun Fight 80 - Heavyweight Tournament, Quarterfinals || Shanghai, China || KO (body punch) ||1 || 0:43

|-  style="background:#cfc;"
| 2018-12-01 || Win ||align=left| Mathieu Kongolo || Collision Fighting League 4 || Lazarevac, Serbia || KO (left hook to the body) || 1 || 0:40

|-  style="background:#cfc;"
| 2018-04-12 || Win ||align=left| Pascal Touré || Collision Fighting League 2 || Serbia || TKO (Punches) || 3 || 2:55

|-  style="background:#fbb;"
| 2018-03-24 || Loss ||align=left| Tomáš Hron || Night of Warriors 2018 || Liberec, Czech Republic || Decision || 3 || 3:00

|-  style="background:#cfc;"
| 2017-09-30 || Win ||align=left| Dimitris Vakakis || Collision Fighting League || Serbia || Decision || 3 ||3:00

|-  style="background:#cfc;"
| 2017-04-29 || Win ||align=left| Ondřej Hutník || Simply the Best 14 Prague || Prague, Czech Republic || KO (high kick) || 1 ||

|-  style="background:#cfc;"
| 2017-02-26 || Win ||align=left| Martin Sabo || Warrior Destiny || Weiz, Austria || KO || 2 ||

|-  style="background:#cfc;"
| 2017-01-29 || Win ||align=left| Ionuț Iancu || Roat To W5 || Novi Sad, Serbia || TKO (low kick) || 2 ||

|-  style="background:#fbb;"
| 2016-10-27 || Loss ||align=left| Fabio Kwasi || K-1 World GP 2016 -95kg Championship Tournament, Semi Finals || Belgrade, Serbia || Decision (unanimous)||3 ||3:00
|-
|-  style="background:#cfc;"
| 2016-10-27 || Win ||align=left| Emmanuel Payet || K-1 World GP 2016 -95kg Championship Tournament, Quarter Finals || Belgrade, Serbia || Decision (unanimous)||3 ||3:00 

|-  style="background:#cfc;"
| 2016-10-08 || Win ||align=left| Martin Sabo || Warriors Destiny ||  || KO (head kick)||1 || 

|-  style="background:#cfc;"
| 2016-02-28 || Win ||align=left| Aleksandar Brkić || BPN Vol. XVII || Novi Sad, Serbia || KO (high kick) || 2 ||

|-

|- bgcolor="#CCFFCC"
| 2015-08-29 || Win || align="left" | Hrvoje Ujević || 2015 WAKO European Junior Championships, Final  || San Sebastian, Spain || KO (Knee) ||  ||  
|-
! style=background:white colspan=9 |

|-

See also
List of male kickboxers

External links
Profile at ONE

References

1997 births
Living people
Serbian male kickboxers
Canadian male kickboxers
Heavyweight kickboxers
ONE Championship kickboxers 
Sportspeople from Belgrade